Clive Farai Augusto (born 26 July 1994) is a Zimbabwean footballer who plays as a forward for CAPS United and the Zimbabwe national football team.

Club career
Born in Harare suburb Mabvuku, he started his career at DT Africa United before spells at second level sides Twalumba and Darwin. In 2015 he moved to Ngezi Platinum with whom he clinched promotion to the Zimbabwe Premier Soccer League.

He then scored 14 goals in 17 matches for Chicken Inn, but left them after only 8 months in August 2019 for Maritzburg United after becoming unsettled at the club.

Augusto returned to Zimbabwe in August 2021, signing for CAPS United after an unsuccessful period in South Africa with Maritzburg United and then Uthongathi.

References

External links

1994 births
Living people
Sportspeople from Harare
Association football forwards
Zimbabwean footballers
Zimbabwe international footballers
Ngezi Platinum F.C. players
Chicken Inn F.C. players
Maritzburg United F.C. players
Uthongathi F.C. players
CAPS United players
Zimbabwe Premier Soccer League players
South African Premier Division players
Zimbabwean expatriate footballers
Zimbabwean expatriate sportspeople in South Africa
Expatriate soccer players in South Africa